But Not Farewell is an album by American jazz pianist Andrew Hill, recorded in 1990 and released on the Blue Note label in 1991. The album features seven of Hill's original compositions with four performed by his quintet, one duet with saxophonist Greg Osby, and two solo piano pieces.

Reception

The Allmusic review by Scott Yanow awarded the album 4 stars and stated "This is a recommended set of stimulating post-bop jazz. Andrew Hill's highly distinctive piano playing and unusual compositions hint at the past while following their own rules".

Track listing
All compositions by Andrew Hill
 "Westbury" - 7:19  
 "But Not Farewell" - 7:09  
 "Nicodemus" - 8:23  
 "Georgia Ham" - 17:18  
 "Friends" - 5:41  
 "Sunnyside" - 3:41  
 "Gone" - 13:30
Recorded at Clinton Recording Studio, New York City on July 12 (tracks 1-4), July 13 (track 5) and September 16 (tracks 6 & 7), 1990

Personnel
Andrew Hill - piano
Greg Osby - soprano saxophone (tracks 1-3), alto saxophone (tracks 4 & 5)
Robin Eubanks - trombone (tracks 1-4)
Lonnie Plaxico - bass (tracks 1-4)
Cecil Brooks III - drums (tracks 1-4)

References

Blue Note Records albums
Andrew Hill albums
1991 albums